John Mathias Haffert ( 23 August 1915 –  31 October 2001) was an American Roman Catholic author and editor. He wrote several books, mostly on Roman Catholic themes, co-founded Catholic societies, edited Catholic magazines and lectured on Catholic issues.

Biography
Haffert received his high school and college education at Mt. Carmel College, a Carmelite seminary, and then began his career as an author and lecturer.  Haffert was the co-founder of the Blue Army of Our Lady of Fatima, a Roman Catholic Marian Society which was approved by Pope Pius XII and has about 25 million members worldwide.  Haffert was assisted in the creation and Daily operations of Blue Army of Our Lady of Fatima by Father Venard Poslusney.  He was the editor of "Scapular Magazine" which helped enroll one million Americans in the Blue Army of Our Lady of Fatima and in prayer for the Soviet Union.

Haffert was a strong advocate of the message of Our Lady of Fatima and he worked with Fatima visionary Sister Lucia dos Santos to develop the "Fatima Pledge" in 1946. This later became the "Blue Army Pledge", in 1948.  Haffert spoke often on topics concerning the Miracle of the Sun.  One of Haffert's books, "That Wonderful Poem", endorses The Poem of the Man God by Maria Valtorta, in which he explains how the Bishop of Fatima introduced him to these writings.

Haffert died at 86 in the United States.

Bibliography 
 John Haffert, 1950 "Russia Will Be Converted" 
 John Haffert, 1961 Meet the Witnesses of the Miracle of the Sun 
 John Haffert, 1966 Night of Love 
 John Haffert, 1970 Sex and the Mysteries 
 John Haffert, 1971 Sign of Heart 
 John Haffert, 1971 Brother and I 
 John Haffert, 1974 There is Nothing More 
 John Haffert, 1981 Dear Bishop 
 John Haffert, 1982 Who is the Woman 
 John Haffert, 1989 The Meaning of Akita 
 John Haffert, 1992 That Wonderful Poem
 John Haffert, 1993, Her Glorious Title 
 John Haffert, 1993 Her Own Words 
 John Haffert, 1993 Finally Russia 
 John Haffert, 1996 Explosion of the Supernatural 
 John Haffert, 1997 Now The Woman 
 John Haffert, 1998, Sign of Her Heart 
 John Haffert, 1998, God's Final Effort 
 John Haffert, 1998 The Day I Didn’t Die , 
 John Haffert, 1999 Too Late 
 John Haffert, 1999 To Prevent This 
 John Haffert, 2000 Meet The Witnesses 
 John Haffert, 2000 Great Event 
 John Haffert, 2000 Deadline: The Third Secret of Fatima 
 John Haffert, 2000 The World's Greatest Secret 
 John Haffert, 2000 Peacemaker

See also 
 Blue Army of Our Lady of Fatima
 Our Lady of Fatima

Notes

Media
 John Haffert on the Miracle of Fatima
In 1996, John Haffert spoke about Fatima and his book “Meet the Witnesses” in which he personally interviewed nearly 200 witnesses to the Fatima Miracle, describing their detailed witness accounts.

External links 
 World Apostolate of Fatima
 

1915 births
2001 deaths
Carmelites
Roman Catholic writers